Henry of Mecklenburg-Schwerin (19 April 1876 – 3 July 1934) was Prince consort of the Netherlands from 7 February 1901 until his death in 1934 as the husband of Queen Wilhelmina. He was the longest-serving Dutch consort.

Biography
Henry of Mecklenburg-Schwerin was born on 19 April 1876 in Schwerin. He was the youngest son of Frederick Francis II, Grand Duke of Mecklenburg-Schwerin, and his third wife, Princess Marie of Schwarzburg-Rudolstadt.

On 6 February 1901, Henry was created a Prince of the Netherlands and the next day, 7 February, married Queen Wilhelmina in The Hague. Their only child together, Juliana, was born in 1909. On 4 September 1948, Wilhelmina abdicated as queen of the Netherlands, to be succeeded by her daughter. 

Henry also fathered at least one illegitimate child, Pim Lier. Born in 1918, Lier eventually rose to prominence in post-war Dutch politics as chairman of the right-wing extremist Centre Party. The birth of a son out of wedlock was likely to be only symptomatic for the duke's increasingly strained relationship with his wife. This became all the more clear at the  time of the opening ceremony of the Amsterdam Summer Olympics in 1928. Henry was not only to attend, but even to preside over the festivities, but Wilhelmina stayed away, stating that she was prevented from attending by her personal religious conviction that this type of event should not take place on a Sunday.

Henry became the 279th Knight Grand Cross of the Portuguese Order of the Tower and Sword and in 1924 was appointed as the 1,157th Knight of the Spanish Order of the Golden Fleece.

He died in The Hague, Netherlands, on 3 July 1934, aged 58.

Scouting
He successfully merged the two Dutch Boy Scout organisations Nederlandse Padvinders Organisatie (NPO, Netherlands Pathfinder Organisation) and the Nederlandse Padvinders Bond (NPB, Netherlands Pathfinder Federation) on 11 December 1915 to form De Nederlandse Padvinders (NPV, The Netherlands Pathfinders). He became the Royal Commissioner of that organisation and he asked Jean Jacques Rambonnet to become chairman in 1920.

Extramarital relationships
Prince Henry was known to have had numerous extra-marital affairs. It is rumored that, overall, Prince Henry fathered between three and ten illegitimate children, but firm proof remains elusive, except for Albrecht Willem Lier, known as the above-noted Pim Lier (22 July 1918 – 9 April 2015). During her widowhood, Queen Wilhelmina paid monthly allowances to three known ex-mistresses:  Julia Cervey in Geneva (two hundred guilders per month); Wilhelmine Steiner in Zurich (five hundred guilders per month); and Mien Lier-Wenneker (1887-1973), in The Hague (five hundred guilders per month). Mien Abbo-Wenneker (later Lier-Wenneker, 1887-1973), gave birth to a total of six children; the older two, sisters Christina Margaretha Abbo & Edith Abbo (later Sheep-Abbo) were ostensibly the daughters of Mien’s first husband, Dhr. Abbo, but strongly rumored to have been fathered by Prince Henry. In 1919, Mien married Lieutenant Jan Derk Lier, a former aide-de-camp to Prince Henry.  A grant of one hundred thousand guilders was arranged for Lt. Lier from the State by police chief François van 't Sant, whom Queen Wilhelmina engaged to verify the facts of her husband’s extramarital relationships and children.  This, plus a monthly allowance to the Lt from the state of one thousand guilders, was in return for his commitment to "the three children of HRH.”

The male parent of the remaining three children was not verified as being either Prince Henry or Lt. Lier.  Subsequent to their birth, no additional allowance was settled on the family; in fact, the monthly allowance of one thousand guilders to Lt. Jan Derk Lier was halved by van't Sant after a short period, although the allowance to his wife continued.

Honours and awards
German decorations

 Netherlands:
 Grand Cross of the Netherlands Lion
 Grand Cross of the Order of Orange-Nassau
 Knight of the Gold Lion of Nassau
 Grand Cross of the House Order of Orange
 Grand Master of the Johanniter Order, 30 April 1909
 Cross of Merit of the Dutch Red Cross
 Wedding Medal of Queen Wilhelmina and Duke Henry of Mecklenburg-Schwerin, 1901
 Austria-Hungary: Grand Cross of the Royal Hungarian Order of St. Stephen, 1903

Foreign decorations

Ancestry

See also

 PEC Zwolle, football club named in his honour

References

External links

 

1876 births
1934 deaths
House of Orange-Nassau
Dutch royal consorts
Dutch members of the Dutch Reformed Church
Members of the Council of State (Netherlands)
House of Mecklenburg-Schwerin
Dutch people of German descent
Royal Netherlands Army officers
Royal Netherlands Army generals
Royal Netherlands Navy admirals
Royal Netherlands Navy officers
Royal Netherlands East Indies Army generals
Royal Netherlands East Indies Army officers
Prussian Army personnel
Converts to Calvinism from Lutheranism
Sea rescue
Scouting and Guiding in the Netherlands
Burials in the Royal Crypt at Nieuwe Kerk, Delft
Wilhelmina of the Netherlands
Recipients of the Order of the Netherlands Lion
Knights Grand Cross of the Order of Orange-Nassau
Grand Crosses of the Order of the House of Orange
Grand Crosses of the Order of Saint Stephen of Hungary
Grand Crosses of the Order of Christ (Portugal)
Knights of the Golden Fleece of Spain
Honorary Knights Grand Cross of the Order of the Bath
Knights of the Order of Saint John in the Netherlands
Recipients of the Order of the White Eagle (Poland)
Sons of monarchs